Ponticoccus litoralis  is a Gram-negative and strictly aerobic bacterium from the genus Ponticoccus which has been isolated from coastal seawater from Busan on Korea.

References 

Rhodobacteraceae
Bacteria described in 2008